Elizabeth Astor Winthrop Chanler Chapman (February 23, 1866 – June 5, 1937) was an American heiress and socialite during the Gilded Age.

Early life and family
Elizabeth, or "Bessie", was the eldest surviving daughter born to U.S. Representative John Winthrop Chanler (1826–1877) and Margaret Astor (née Ward) Chanler (1838–1875) of the wealthy Astor family.  Through her father, she was a descendant of Peter Stuyvesant, the last Dutch Director-General of New Amsterdam, Wait Winthrop and Joseph Dudley. Through her mother, she was a grand-niece of Julia Ward Howe, John Jacob Astor III, and William Backhouse Astor, Jr. (husband of Caroline Schermerhorn Astor, who was Elizabeth's godmother).  Chanler and her siblings became orphans after the death of their mother in December 1875 and their father in October 1877, both to pneumonia.  The children were raised at Rokeby, their parents' 43 room estate in Barrytown.

Elizabeth, a "beautiful and tough-minded woman who even in the nursery was known as 'Queen Bess' by her siblings," had nine brothers and sisters, including John Armstrong Chanler (who married novelist Amélie Louise Rives); politicians William Astor Chanler, Lewis Stuyvesant Chanler, and the artist Robert Winthrop Chanler. Her sister Margaret Livingston Chanler, served as a nurse with the American Red Cross during the Spanish–American War (and wife of Richard Aldrich), Winthrop Astor Chanler, served in the Rough Riders in Cuba and was wounded at the Battle of Tayacoba.

Society life
At her father's death in 1871, his estate was valued between $1,500,000 (equivalent to $) and $2,000,000 (equivalent to $ in  dollars). John Winthrop Chanler's will provided $20,000 a year for each child for life, enough to live comfortably by the standards of the time.

In 1892, Elizabeth, her sisters, Margaret and Alida, and her brother Winthrop and his wife Margaret, were all included in Ward McAllister's "Four Hundred," purported to be an index of New York's best families, published in The New York Times. Conveniently, 400 was the number of people that could fit into Mrs. Astor's ballroom.  Elizabeth was a member of the Cosmopolitan Club of New York.

In 1893, while she was in London for a brother's wedding, John Singer Sargent, the most famous and sought after portrait artist of the day, painted a portrait of the then twenty-six year old Elizabeth.  According to Sargent, she had "the face of the Madonna and the eyes of a child."  Her son donated the portrait to the Smithsonian American Art Museum in 1980.

Personal life

On April 23, 1899, Chanler married author John Jay Chapman (1862–1933), the son of Henry Grafton Chapman, a president of the New York Stock Exchange, and Eleanor Kingsland (née Jay) Chapman, a great-granddaughter of John Jay, the first Supreme Court Chief Justice. Chapman was previously married to Minna Timmins, who died in 1897. Elizabeth and her husband had one child together:

 Chanler Armstrong Chapman (1901–1982), who married Olivia James, a niece of Henry James.  They divorced and he married the former Helen Riesenfeld, a writer, in 1948. After her death in 1970, he married Dr. Ida R. Holzbert Wagman in 1972.  Reportedly, Chapman served as the model for Saul Bellow's 1959 novel Henderson the Rain King.

Her husband died at her home, "Good Hap", on November 4, 1933 near Barrytown, New York.  After his death, Elizabeth spent several years working on a volume of his collected letters, which she completed just before her own death.

Elizabeth died on June 5, 1937 and was buried at Saint Matthew's Episcopal Churchyard in Bedford, New York.

Residences
In 1902, Elizabeth bought the former Livingston mansion, known as Edgewater, and located next to her childhood home, Rokeby, in Barrytown, New York for $20,000 from the estate of the second owner, Robert Donaldson Jr.  In 1905, she and her husband moved into a new house, known as Sylvania, that was designed by architect Charles A. Platt, and built on the hill above Edgewater.  Thereafter, her mother-in-law lived at Edgewater from 1910 until at least 1914.  In 1917, Elizabeth sold Edgewater to her stepson, Conrad Chapman, for $1.00.  Conrad lived abroad most of his life and eventually sold the house in 1947.  The house was later owned by writer Gore Vidal and financier Richard Jenrette. Shortly before her husband's death, they moved into a cottage built on the grounds of Sylvania they named "Good Hap" and turned Sylvania over to her son, Chanler Chapman.

References
Notes

Sources

External links

 
 Video "Director's Choice - Elizabeth Winthrop Chanler by John Singer Sargent"

1866 births
1937 deaths
Elizabeth Astor Winthrop
Astor Orphans
Elizabeth Astor Winthrop
People from Dutchess County, New York
Elizabeth Astor Winthrop
Chanler family
Winthrop family